The Franklinton Post Office is a historic building in the Franklinton neighborhood of Columbus, Ohio. It was listed on the National Register of Historic Places in 1973. Also known as the David Deardurff House, it was built of hand-hewed logs by Deardurff in 1807. The two-story house sits on a limestone foundation. It is the oldest building in Columbus still on its original foundation. The building is on Gift Street, an area owned by Franklinton founder Lucas Sullivant, given to early settlers. The first post office in Franklinton was established here.

See also
 National Register of Historic Places listings in Columbus, Ohio

References

External links
 

Commercial buildings on the National Register of Historic Places in Ohio
Government buildings completed in 1807
National Register of Historic Places in Columbus, Ohio
Columbus Register properties
Vernacular architecture in Ohio
Franklinton (Columbus, Ohio)